Elijah Round (born January 1882) was an English footballer. His regular position was as a goalkeeper. He was born in Stoke-on-Trent. He played for Manchester United, Oldham Athletic, and Barnsley.

External links
MUFCInfo profile

1882 births
English footballers
Manchester United F.C. players
Oldham Athletic A.F.C. players
Barnsley F.C. players
Footballers from Stoke-on-Trent
Year of death missing
Association football goalkeepers